Tickton is a village and civil parish in the East Riding of Yorkshire, England.

The civil parish consists of the villages of Tickton and Hull Bridge together with the hamlets of Eske and Weel. According to the 2011 UK census, Tickton parish had a population of 1,731, an increase on the 2001 UK census figure of 1,586.

The place-name 'Tickton' is first attested in the Domesday Book of 1086, where it appears as Tichetone. The name means 'Tica's homestead or village'.

Governance
Tickton is represented locally by Tickton and Routh Parish Council, a joint council with the adjacent parish of Routh. It is within the Beverley Rural ward of the East Riding of Yorkshire Council. At the parliamentary level it is part of Beverley and Holderness, currently represented by Graham Stuart of the Conservative Party.

Media 
In 2015 107.8 Beverley FM was launched. This is a station specifically for the community in Beverley and all of its surrounding areas, including Tickton.

Infrastructure 
In February 2023, a regional internet service provider, Connexin, installed notices on lampposts around the village, informing residents of plans to erect new telegraph poles along several streets. In a parish council meeting held later in the month, residents complained the poles would be an "eyesore" not worth the promise of faster and cheaper broadband.

Notable people
Kyle Edmund (1995-), tennis player, grew up in Tickton.

References

External links

Villages in the East Riding of Yorkshire
Civil parishes in the East Riding of Yorkshire